John McCluskey (23 January 1944 – 17 July 2015) born in Hamilton, South Lanarkshire, was a Scottish amateur flyweight and professional fly/bantam/featherweight boxer of the 1960s and 1970s.

Boxing career
As an amateur he won the 1964 and 1965 Amateur Boxing Association British flyweight title, when boxing out of the Larkhall ABC.

1964 Olympic results
 Round of 32: defeated Veerapan Komolsen (Thailand) by decision, 4-1
 Round of 16: lost to Stanislav Sorokin (Soviet Union) referee stopped contest

References

External links

Image - John McCluskey

Scottish male boxers
Boxers at the 1964 Summer Olympics
Olympic boxers of Great Britain
Bantamweight boxers
Featherweight boxers
Flyweight boxers
England Boxing champions
Sportspeople from Hamilton, South Lanarkshire
1944 births
2015 deaths